The Detroit version of the NWA World Tag Team Championship was the top ranked professional wrestling championship for tag teams in the Detroit, Michigan-based promotion Big Time Wrestling, sometimes referred to as NWA Detroit, between 1965 and 1980. As a member of the National Wrestling Alliance (NWA), All-Star Wrestling was entitled to promote their own local version of the championship as the NWA bylaws did not restrict its use in the way they restricted the NWA World Heavyweight Championship to one nationally recognized championship. Because individual NWA members, referred to as NWA territories, were allowed to create their own version of the NWA World Tag Team Championship, at least 22 different versions existed between 1949 and 1991.  As it is a professional wrestling championship, it is not won or lost competitively, but instead is determined by the decision of the bookers of a wrestling promotion. The title is awarded after the chosen team "wins" a match to maintain the illusion that professional wrestling is a competitive sport.

The first championship team recognized in Detroit was that of the Tolos brothers (Chris and John Tolos), who were introduced as champions around February 1965 as having "recently won" the championship, though no records of a tournament exists. Kurt Von Hess and Karl Von Shotz held the championship five times as a team, the record for the 25-year history of this version of the NWA World Tag Team Championship, while Fred Curry holds the record for most overall reigns (9) with different partners. The shortest reign belongs to Lou Klein and Ed George, as Klein announced his retirement right after the match, making their reign only minutes long. The longest reign lasted at least 196 days as The Fabulous Kangaroos (Al Costello and Don Kent) won the championship on December 18, 1971, and held it until May 1972.

Title history
Key

Team reigns by combined length
Key

Individual reigns by combined length
Key

Footnotes

References

World Tag Team Championship
National Wrestling Alliance championships
Tag team wrestling championships